Veronica Simogun (born 1962) is a Papua New Guinea activist for women's rights and against violence. She was awarded an International Women of Courage Award in 2017.

Life
Simogun was born near Wewak in 1962. She was born in a village named Urip village in the Boykin/Dagua. Simogun has a certificate in civil aviation which she gained at the Civil Aviation Training College. She worked for six years in civil aviation when she returned to Urip. In her home village she worked to improve local community. She campaigned against violence against women.

She was nominated for her work by Catherine Ebert-Gray for an International Women of Courage Award.

References

1962 births
Living people
People from East Sepik Province
Papua New Guinean women's rights activists
Papua New Guinean women activists
Recipients of the International Women of Courage Award